Henry Maule was an 18th-century Anglican bishop in Ireland.

Maule had previously been Dean of Cloyne from 1720 to 1726. A member of the Royal Dublin Society, he died on 13 April 1758.

References

Anglican bishops of Cloyne
Anglican bishops of Dromore
Anglican bishops of Meath
Deans of Cloyne
1679 births
1758 deaths
18th-century Anglican bishops in Ireland